Mark Pettis (born December 18, 1950) is an American Republican politician from Wisconsin.

Born in Osceola, Wisconsin, Pettis served in the United States Navy. He served on the Burnett County, Wisconsin Board of Supervisors. Pettis began serving in the Wisconsin State Assembly in 1997 and served until his defeat in 2006.

Notes

People from Osceola, Wisconsin
County supervisors in Wisconsin
Members of the Wisconsin State Assembly
1950 births
Living people
21st-century American politicians
People from Burnett County, Wisconsin